Daybreaker is the third album by singer-songwriter Beth Orton released in 2002 on Heavenly Records and the Astralwerks Records label. The album reached #40 in US and #8 in UK. Mojo Magazine called the album "her best to date...". Q Magazine was not excited about the album: "Tortoise-pace strumming and a crippling shortage of choruses produce only torpor".  The album earned Orton a nomination at the BRIT Awards for Best British Female Singer as well as Best Album at the Q Awards.

In an interview to Insound.com on 28 July 2002 she said about making the record:

As of 2003 it has sold 169,000 copies in the United States.

Track listing
"Paris Train" (Ted Barnes, Orton)
"Concrete Sky" (Johnny Marr, Orton)
"Mount Washington" (Orton)
"Anywhere" (Orton)
"Daybreaker" (Orton)
"Carmella" (Orton)
"God Song" (Orton)
"This One's Gonna Bruise" (Ryan Adams, Orton)
"Ted's Waltz" (Barnes, Orton)
"Thinking About Tomorrow" (Ted Barnes, Orton, Sean Read, Sebastian Steinberg)

The Japanese version features two bonus tracks: "Ali's Waltz" and "Bobby Gentry", both also on the Concrete Sky EP.

Personnel
 Producer - Victor Van Vugt
 Additional production - Ben Watt
 Acoustic Guitar - Ted Barnes
 Drums - Will Blanchard
 Engineer - Richard "Dread" Mann
 Assistant Engineer - John McCormack
 Bass Guitar - Ali Friend
 Keyboards - Sean Read
 Mastered By - Miles Showell
 Mixer - Andy Bradfield, Ben Watt
 Ryan Adams - acoustic guitar on 'This One's Gonna Bruise', bass and slide guitar on 'God Song', piano, bass, guitars and backing vocals on 'Carmella' and 'Concrete Sky'

Charts

Weekly charts

Year-end charts

Certifications

References 

Beth Orton albums
2002 albums
Albums produced by Victor Van Vugt